A content partnership is a term describing a joint venture between brands, broadcasters, publishers and producers to create original audio visual programming across any media platform.  Stakeholders in the project co-finance and share the exploitation rights to that content and its intellectual property.

Most commercial content partnerships are now being applied to Advertiser Funded Programming (AFP) where brands directly fund TV shows.  These new partnerships allow advertisers to gain web exploitation rights without having to fully fund the creation of original programming.

Changes in UK product placement legislation in March 2011 will also allow advertisers to co-fund television content that features their brands within the editorial of the show.

Some recent examples of content partnerships:

The Krypton Factor, in partnership with The Sage Group on ITV
The Factory on Eurosport, in partnership with the Philips and AT&T Williams F1
Vodafone TBA on Channel 4, in partnership with Vodafone
Crest toothpaste in The Apprentice
American Express in The Restaurant

Advertising industry